Alder Lake is Intel's codename for the 12th-generation of Intel Core processors

Alder Lake may also refers to:
 Alder Lake (Washington), a reservoir on the Nisqually River in Eatonville, Washington in the U.S. state of Washington.
 Alder Lake (New York), a body of water located in Hardenburgh, Ulster County in the lower Hudson Valley region of New York.

See also 

 Alden Lake
 Aller Lake
 Allen Lake (disambiguation)